Méfiez-vous, mesdames! (English title: Be Careful, Ladies!) is a 1963 French comedy film directed by André Hunebelle. The screenplay was written by Pierre Foucaud and Jean Halain, based on a novel by Ange Bastiani. It tells the story of a former lawyer who discovers a woman's murder plot.

Cast
Michèle Morgan as  Gisèle Duparc 
Danielle Darrieux as  Hedwige 
Sandra Milo as  Henriette 
Paul Meurisse as  Charles Rouvier 
Martine Sarcey as  Colette de Marval 
Yves Rénier as  Christian 
Marcel Pérès as  Le gardien de prison 
Léon Zitrone as  Himself

See also
Servez-vous, mesdames

References

External links

Méfiez-vous, mesdames! at DvdToile 
Méfiez-vous, mesdames! at AlloCiné 

Italian comedy films
French comedy films
French black-and-white films
Films directed by André Hunebelle
1963 comedy films
1963 films
1960s French films
1960s Italian films